Oscar Wilson  (186713 July 1930) was an English painter and illustrator who trained in both London and Belgium. He was a painter, illustrator, and joke cartoonist.

Biography
The census returns for Oscar Wilson show him as being born c. 1863 in Hackney, London but his Who's Who entry shows his year of birth as 1867. Very little appears to be known about his early life. He trained at the South Kensington School of Art and than at the Antwerp Academy under Charles Verlat and Polydore Beaufaux.

It is not clear when he travelled to Belgium or returned to England. The only child of the marriage, a son, Water was born c. 1890 in Belgium, as was his wife Jeanne (born c. 1871). The 1911 census return shows them as having been married for 25 year, which would give the date of the marriage as 1885, when Jeanne was 14.

Wilson exhibited at the Royal Academy in 1888 and 1889 with his address in Park Cottage, Lee Road, Blackheath, London. However, his son was born in Belgium in c. 1890 and he was in Antwerp in 1891. Wilson was in England in 1894 when he gave evidence in the 'Pick-me-up indecency case in July. In this case the police seized copies of the illustrated paper from stationers Smith and Son in Liverpool on the grounds that the juxtaposition of two illustrations in the magazine produced an indecent image. Wilson was one of the illustrators involved and he gave evidence against the suggestion of indecency.

Benezit reports that Wilson travelled to Africa, it is not certain when this was, but he had an illustration in The Graphic in 1910 showing the call to prayer in Cairo.

The 1901 census shows Wilson living at 19 Colville Road, Notting Hill, London with his wife and son. By 1911 they had moved to 47 Blenheim Crescent, Notting Hill. The census showed also that the couple had had only one child, Walter, now aged 21 and working as a "motor-car agent", i.e. a car salesman. His "Who Was Who" address was 47 Blenheim Crescent, and he died at his home on 13 July 1930.

Works
Bryant describes him as a painter, illustrator and joke cartoonist. Johnson and Greutzner describe him as a genre painter. Benezit and Micklethwait list him as a genre painter and illustrator of books, magazines and newspapers, and state that he was particularly known for his pictures of pretty women. Wilson also illustrated postcards, at least on World War One topics.

Wilson also engaged in commercial art, producing illustrations, together with others, for two promotional publications by the Great Eastern Railway Company. The first of these was East Coast Pictures by Percy Lindley, intended to encourage people to visit the seaside resorts on the East Coast. The second was To the Continent, intended to promote travel to the Continent via Harwich. A special feature of this publication was the large number of colour illustrations from drawings by Wilson, "showing better than any description could do the luxuries of the Harwich steamboat service."

Wilson was a frequent exhibitor and exhibited as follows: 
 Two works at the Dudley Gallery or New Dudley Gallery
 Two works at the Glasgow Institute of the Fine Arts
 22 works at the Walker Art Gallery, Liverpool
 Eight works at the Manchester City Art Gallery. In 1891 Wilson exhibited The Flower Market, Antwerp at Manchester, which the Manchester Courier called a "remarkably clever picture", stating the Wilson was "strongly under the influence of foreign schools." The "Gazette" went on state that the scene was "full of life and character, and the various groups of flower-girls and of Antwerp civilians are cleverly introduced and painted; the figures have all been carefully studied from life, and represent all types from the well-to-do citizen to the peasant," and that in all respects it was "an admirable example of the artist's work."
 Three works at the Royal Academy. In 1888 the Liverpool Mercury listed his L'Amateur d' Estampes as another "good pictures among the oils." 
 13 works at the Royal Society of British Artists. At the Winter Exhibition of the society in 1891, Wilson exhibited La Modiste, which the Acton Gazette described as a "luminous little bit". In 1892 Wilson exhibited pictures showing scenes in Antwerp which St James's Gazette considered to be "quite interesting, mainly by reason of the excellent arrangement of colour" and said that the catalogue illustrations did not do them justice.
 Seven works at the Royal Cambrian Academy
 Two works at the Royal Institute of Painters in Water Colours
 One work at the Royal Miniature Society
 25 works at the Royal Institute of Oil Painters
 Three works at the Royal Scottish Academy. In 1928, Still Life by Wilson was sold from the exhibition of the Academy.

Wilson exhibited at other venues, including the Leeds Municipal Art Gallery in 1890, where he showed Mon Atelier, showing a sculptor's studio, lined with classical casts which are being studied by fashionably dressed lady.  The Yorkshire Post considered that the painting was "admirable in tone, and full of sound workmanship, while if the figure introduced some respects rather jarring note, it gives a humorous turn to the spectator's thoughts by reason of the contrast it affords." In 1897 Wilson exhibited at the Black and White gallery, where his work was described as "Brilliant, somewhat French in influence, and entirely modern in feeling" His pieceOutside the Empire was described as a "clever and characteristic example of this artist's skill in depicting the modern woman as he sees her."

Wilson was one of the initial members of the Society of Painters in Miniature (led by Alyn Williams) in 1896, the year of its founding. The society restricted itself to fifty members who were professional artists. At the first exhibition of the society he showed Playmates with a child and a kitten playing together next to an array of valuable pottery. He was elected an Associate of the Royal Society of British Artists in 1926.

Magazine Illustration

Wilson's Who Was Who entry  states that he had drawn for all the principle magazines and newspapers. Among these his illustrations appeared in were:
Black and White
Cassell's Family Magazine
The English Illustrated Magazine
The Gaiety
The Gentlewoman
The Graphic
The Idler
The Illustrated London News
The Illustrated Sporting and Dramatic News
The Lady's Pictorial
The Lady's Realm
London Opinion
Madame
New Budget
The Pall Mall Magazine
Pearson's Magazine
Pick-Me-Up
The Sketch
St Paul's Magazine
Tatler
The West End Review
The Windsor Magazine

The editor of Pick-Me-Up stated that Wilson was one of his five staff artists. Wilson's magazine illustrations were well regarded. He was the second in a list of nine artists whose work was purchased for their Art Gallery by Preston Corporation in 1913. The artists were described as being "amongst the finest artists of the day".

Reviewers repeatedly heaped praise on the illustrations by Wilson, and what is more to the point, they often singled out his work from that of up to a dozen other artists illustrating the magazine, in very short single paragraph reviews of the magazines:
1894 "The coloured supplement to St. Paul's This week is a really exquisite study of a trim little milliner by Oscar Wilson."
1895 "St Paul's contains many clever and piquant pictures. There is a charming coloured plate, by Oscar Wilson, of the dainty Lady Kitty, whose social adventures are quite a feature of this popular weekly."
1896 "St. Paul's is very delightful with several coloured illustrations, including a dainty study, The Favourite by Oscar Wilson."
1896 St. Paul's delights it readers ever week with some pages of coloured sketches by Mr Oscar Wilson and others.
1896 (in a review of St. Paul's) "Two coloured full page illustrations, An Encore, by Oscar Wilson and Mars and Venus by T. Manuel are simply bewitching."
1896 "Amongst the weeklies St. Paul's is strong in sport and drama, and in coloured pictures, the best of which is OScar Wilson's In Wild March.
1896 (in a review of St. Paul's) "two dainty full page tinted pictures by Oscar Wilson."
1896 "St. Paul's has a charming coloured sketch by Mr. Oscar Wilson of a flower girl..."
1896 (in a review of St. Paul's) "The Children's Hero is a capital sketch of the pantomime clown by Mr Oscar Wilson."
1898 (in a review of the West End Review) "Oscar Wilson's Balloon Man is a good example of the lighter side of art." 
1898 (in a review of St. Paul's) " . . . a clever drawing by Mr Oscar Wilson"
1898 (in a review of The English Illustrated Magazine) ". . . the up to date artists, Oscar Wilson and Hal Hurst"
1898 (in a review of The Sketch) "There are clever and characteristic sketches of frivolous femininity by Mr Dudley Hardy and Mr Oscar Wilson"
1899 (in a review of the West End Review) "There is a full page picture besides, by Oscar Wilson, worth all the money called The First Ice of Summer."
1899 (in a review of Black and White) "The double page picture by Oscar Wilson, The Judgement of Paris is excellent."
1900 (in a review of The Lady's Pictorial) "There is a very nice picture by Oscar Wilson"
1906 (in a review of Tatler) "Oscar Wilson contributes two excellent pictures in The Piazza, Venice, and The Broken Pitcher"

Book illustrations

Wilson illustrated dozens of books. Initially, most of his illustration work was for Ward Lock & Co but after 1905 it was almost all for the Society for Promoting Christian Knowledge (SPCK). Most of the following list has been sourced from a search on the Jisc Library Hub Discover database, supplemented by searches in newspaper archives. The list is probably not complete, as reviews and advertisements do not always give the name of the illustrator. The sources of the entries is the Jisc database search, unless otherwise noted.

Example of book illustration by Wilson

Among the books that Wilson illustrated was Two Adventurers in Search for El Dorado (Samuel Low, Marston and Co., London, 1915) by Harry Collingwood.  Images by courtesy of the Internet Archive.

Notes

References

External links
 

1867 births
1930 deaths
19th-century British painters
20th-century British painters
English watercolourists
British portrait painters
British male painters
English illustrators
British illustrators
British children's book illustrators
Magazine illustrators
Members of the Royal Society of British Artists
19th-century British male artists
20th-century British male artists